Paty may refer to:

 Páty, a village in Hungary
 Paty (footballer) (born 1990), Angolan footballer
 Samuel Paty (1973–2020), French victim of terrorism

See also
 
 Patty (disambiguation)